Rupanpur  is a village in Kapurthala district of Punjab State, India. The village is administrated by a Sarpanch who is an elected representative of village as per the constitution of India and Panchayati raj (India).

Demography 
According to the report published by 2011 Census of India, Rupanpur has a total of 88 houses and population of 491, of which includes 262 males and 229 females. Literacy rate of Rupanpur is 75.00%, lower than the state average of 75.84%. The population of children under the age of 6 years is 51 which is 10.39% of total population of Rupanpur, and child sex ratio is approximately 457, lower than the state average of 846.

Population data

References

External links
  Villages in Kapurthala
 Kapurthala Villages List

Villages in Kapurthala district